This is a list of high schools in the state of North Dakota.

Adams County
Hettinger High School - Hettinger

Barnes County
Valley City High School - Valley City
Barnes County North High School - Wimbledon

Defunct
North Central High School - Rodgers (closed in 2016)
Wimbledon-Courtenay High School - Wimbledon (Closed 2016)

Benson County
Four Winds Community High School - Fort Totten
Leeds High School - Leeds
Maddock High School - Maddock
Minnewaukan High School - Minnewaukan
Warwick High School - Warwick

Bottineau County
Bottineau High School - Bottineau
Newburg-United High School - Newburg
Westhope High School - Westhope
Willow City High School - Willow City

Bowman County
Bowman County High School - Bowman
Scranton High School - Scranton

Defunct
Rhame High School - Rhame (closed in 2006)

Burke County
Bowbells High School - Bowbells
Burke Central High School - Lignite
Powers Lake High School - Powers Lake

Burleigh County
Wing High School - Wing

Bismarck
Bismarck High School
Century High School 
Dakota Adventist Academy
Legacy High School
St. Mary's Central High School 
Shiloh Christian High School
South Central Alternative High School

Cass County

Central Cass High School - Casselton
Horace High School - Horace
Kindred High School - Kindred
Maple Valley High School - Tower City
Northern Cass High School - Hunter

Fargo

Fargo Davies High School
Fargo North High School
Fargo South High School 
Oak Grove Lutheran School 
Shanley High School

West Fargo

 Sheyenne High School
 West Fargo Community High School
 West Fargo High School

Cavalier County

Border Central High School - Calvin
Langdon Area High School - Langdon
Munich High School - Munich

Dickey County

Ellendale High School - Ellendale
Oakes High School - Oakes

Divide County
Divide County High School - Crosby

Dunn County

Halliday High School - Halliday
Killdeer High School - Killdeer

Eddy County
 New Rockford-Sheyenne High School - New Rockford (formerly called New Rockford High School)

Defunct

Sheyenne High School - Sheyenne
St. James High School New Rockford

Emmons County

Hazelton-Moffit-Braddock High School - Hazelton
Linton High School - Linton
Strasburg High School - Strasburg

Foster County

Carrington High School - Carrington
Midkota High School - Glenfield

Golden Valley County
Beach High School - Beach

Grand Forks County

Larimore High School - Larimore
[Midway High School - Inkster
Northwood High School - Northwood
Thompson High School - Thompson

Grand Forks

Central High School 
Red River High School

Grant County

Elgin/New Leipzig High School - Elgin
Roosevelt High School - Carson

Defunct
Border Central High School - Carson (Closed in 2006)

Griggs County
Griggs County Central High School - Cooperstown

Hettinger County

Mott/Regent High School - Mott
New England High School - New England

Kidder County

Steele-Dawson High School - Steele
Tappen High School - Tappen
Tuttle-Pettibone High School - Tuttle

LaMoure County

Edgeley High School - Edgeley
Kulm High School - Kulm
LaMoure High School - LaMoure
Litchville-Marion High School - Marion

Defunct
Verona High School - Verona (closed in 2006)

Logan County

Gackle-Streeter High School - Gackle
Napoleon High School - Napoleon

McHenry County

Anamoose High School - Anamoose
Drake High School - Drake
Granville High School - Granville
TGU-Towner High School - Towner
Velva High School - Velva

McIntosh County

Ashley High School - Ashley
Wishek High School - Wishek
Zeeland High School - Zeeland

McKenzie County

Alexander High School - Alexander
Mandaree High School - Mandaree
Watford City High School - Watford City

McLean County

Garrison High School - Garrison
Max High School - Max
Turtle Lake-Mercer High School - Turtle Lake
Underwood High School - Underwood
Washburn High School - Washburn
White Shield High School - White Shield
Wilton High School - Wilton

Mercer County

Beulah High School - Beulah
Golden Valley High School - Golden Valley
Hazen High School - Hazen
Stanton High School - Stanton

Morton County

Flasher High School - Flasher
Glen Ullin High School - Glen Ullin
Hebron High School - Hebron
Mandan High School - Mandan
New Salem High School - New Salem

Mountrail County

New Town High School - New Town
Parshall High School - Parshall
Stanley High School - Stanley

Nelson County

Dakota Prairie High School - Petersburg
Lakota High School - Lakota

Oliver County
Center-Stanton High School - Center

Pembina County

Cavalier High School - Cavalier
Drayton High School - Drayton
Neche High School - Neche
Pembina High School - Pembina
St. Thomas High School - Saint Thomas
Valley High School - Hoople
Walhalla High School - Walhalla

Pierce County
Rugby High School - Rugby

Ramsey County

Devils Lake High School - Devils Lake
Edmore High School - Edmore
Starkweather High School - Starkweather

Ransom County

Enderlin High School - Enderlin
Lisbon High School - Lisbon

Renville County

Glenburn High School - Glenburn
Mohall Lansford Sherwood High School - Mohall

Defunct

Mohall High School - Mohall
Sherwood High School - Sherwood

Richland County

Fairmount Public School - Fairmount
Hankinson High School - Hankinson
Lidgerwood High School - Lidgerwood
Richland Junior-Senior High School - Colfax
Wahpeton High School - Wahpeton
Wyndmere High School - Wyndmere

Rolette County

Dunseith High School - Dunseith
Mount Pleasant High School - Rolla
Rolette High School - Rolette
St. John High School - Saint John
Turtle Mountain High School - Belcourt

Sargent County

Milnor High School - Milnor
North Sargent High School - Gwinner
Sargent Central High School - Forman

Sheridan County

Goodrich High School - Goodrich
McClusky High School - McClusky

Sioux County

Selfridge High School - Selfridge
Solen High School - Solen
Standing Rock Community School - Fort Yates

Stark County

Belfield High School - Belfield
Dickinson High School - Dickinson
Richardton-Taylor High School - Richardton
South Heart High School - South Heart
Trinity High School - Dickinson

Steele County

Finley-Sharon High School - Finley
Hope-Page High School - Hope

Stutsman County

Jamestown High School - Jamestown
Kensal High School - Kensal
Medina High School - Medina
Montpelier High School - Montpelier
Pingree-Buchanan High School - Pingree

Towner County
North Star High School - Cando (formerly Cando High School)

Defunct

Bisbee-Egeland High School - Bisbee (closed in 2008)
North Central High School - Rocklake

Traill County

Central Valley High School - Buxton
Hatton High School - Hatton
Hillsboro High School - Hillsboro
May-Port CG High School - Mayville

Walsh County

Edinburg High School - Edinburg
Fordville-Lankin High School - Fordville
Grafton High School - Grafton
Minto High School - Minto
Park River Area High School - Park River

Ward County
Des Lacs-Burlington High School - Des Lacs/Burlington

Minot

Bishop Ryan High School 
Minot High School

Wells County

Fessenden-Bowdon High School - Fessenden
Harvey High School - Harvey

Defunct

Bowdon High School - Bowdon
Sykes High School - Sykeston

Williams County

Eight Mile High School - Trenton
Grenora High School - Grenora
Ray High School - Ray
Tioga High School - Tioga
Williston High School - Williston, North Dakota

Defunct

Epping High School - Epping
Wildrose-Alamo High School - Wildrose (closed in 2006)

See also
List of school districts in North Dakota
List of high schools in the United States

External links
List of high schools in North Dakota from SchoolTree.org

North Dakota
High schools, defunct